Conditional access (CA) is a term commonly used in relation to software and to digital television systems. Conditional access is that ‘just-in-time’ evaluation to ensure the person who is seeking access to content is authorized to access the content. Said another way, conditional access is a type of access management. Access is managed is by requiring certain criteria to be met before granting access to the content.

In software 
Conditional access is a function that lets you manage people’s access to the software in question, such as email, applications, and documents. It is usually offered as SaaS (Software-as-a-Service) and deployed in organizations to keep company data safe. By setting conditions on the access to this data, the organization has more control over who accesses the data and where and in what way the information is accessed.

When setting up conditional access, access can be limited to or prevented based on the policy defined by the system administrator. For example, a policy might require access is available from certain networks, or access is blocked when a specific web browser is requesting the access.

In digital television
Under the Digital Video Broadcasting (DVB) standard, conditional access system (CAS) standards are defined in the specification documents for DVB-CA (conditional access), DVB-CSA (the common scrambling algorithm) and DVB-CI (the Common Interface). These standards define a method by which one can obfuscate a digital-television stream, with access provided only to those with valid decryption smart-cards. The DVB specifications for conditional access are available from the standards page on the DVB website.

This is achieved by a combination of scrambling and encryption. The data stream is scrambled with a 48-bit secret key, called the control word. Knowing the value of the control word at a given moment is of relatively little value, as under normal conditions, content providers will change the control word several times per minute. The control word is generated automatically in such a way that successive values are not usually predictable; the DVB specification recommends using a physical process for that.

In order for the receiver to unscramble the data stream, it must be permanently informed about the current value of the control word. In practice, it must be informed slightly in advance, so that no viewing interruption occurs. Encryption is used to protect the control word during transmission to the receiver: the control word is encrypted as an entitlement control message (ECM). The CA subsystem in the receiver will decrypt the control word only when authorised to do so; that authority is sent to the receiver in the form of an entitlement management message (EMM). The EMMs are specific to each subscriber, as identified by the smart card in his receiver, or to groups of subscribers, and are issued much less frequently than ECMs, usually at monthly intervals. This being apparently not sufficient to prevent unauthorized viewing, TPS has lowered this interval down to about 12 minutes. This can be different for every provider, BSkyB uses a term of 6 weeks. When Nagravision 2 was hacked, Digital+ started sending a new EMM every three days to make unauthorized viewing more cumbersome.

The contents of ECMs and EMMs are not standardized and as such they depend on the conditional access system being used.

The control word can be transmitted through different ECMs at once. This allows the use of several conditional access systems at the same time, a DVB feature called simulcrypt, which saves bandwidth and encourages multiplex operators to cooperate. DVB Simulcrypt is widespread in Europe; some channels, like the CNN International Europe from the Hot Bird satellites, can use 7 different CA systems in parallel.
 
The decryption cards are read, and sometimes updated with specific access rights, either through a conditional-access module (CAM), a PC card-format card reader meeting DVB-CI standards, or through a built-in ISO/IEC 7816 card reader, such as that in the Sky Digibox.

Several companies provide competing CA systems; ABV, VideoGuard, Irdeto, Nagravision, Conax, Viaccess, Synamedia, Mediaguard (a.k.a. SECA) are among the most commonly used CA systems.

Due to the common usage of CA in DVB systems, many tools to aid in or even directly circumvent encryption exist. CAM emulators and multiple-format CAMs exist which can either read several card formats or even directly decrypt a compromised encryption scheme. Most multiple format CAMs and all CAMs that directly decrypt a signal are based on reverse engineering of the CA systems. A large proportion of the systems currently in use for DVB encryption have been opened to full decryption at some point, including Nagravision, Conax, Viaccess, Mediaguard (v1) as well as the first version of VideoGuard.

Conditional access in North America 
In Canada and United States, the standard for conditional access is provided with CableCARDs whose specification was developed by the cable company consortium CableLabs.

Cable companies in the United States are required by the Federal Communications Commission to support CableCARDs. Standards exist for two-way communication (M-card), but satellite television has separate standards. Next-generation approaches in the United States eschew such physical cards and employ schemes using downloadable software for conditional access such as DCAS.

The main appeal of such approaches is that the access control may be upgraded dynamically in response to security breaches without requiring expensive exchanges of physical conditional-access modules. Another appeal is that it may be inexpensively incorporated into non-traditional media display devices such as portable media players.

Conditional access systems 
Conditional access systems include:

Analog systems 
EuroCrypt
Nagravision
Videocipher
VideoCrypt

Digital systems

See also
 Access control, the same principle applied outside of television.
 B-CAS
 CableCARD
 Card sharing
 Compression Networks
 Conditional-access module
 DigiCipher 2
 Digital rights management
 Pirate decryption
 PowerVu
 Smart card
 Television encryption
 Viaccess
 Videocipher
 VideoGuard
 Pairing Smartcard

References

External links
CAS history in Spanish
CA ID list on dvbservices.com

Digital television
Digital rights management
Broadcast engineering